Erlind Koreshi (born 9 February 1987) is an Albanian footballer who currently plays as a midfielder for Shkumbini in the Albanian First Division.

External links

Profile - FSHF

1987 births
Living people
Albanian footballers
Association football midfielders
KS Shkumbini Peqin players
KS Lushnja players
KF Bylis Ballsh players
KF Tirana players
KF Teuta Durrës players
KS Kastrioti players
KS Egnatia Rrogozhinë players
Kategoria Superiore players
Kategoria e Parë players